Kuany Kuany may refer to:
 Kuany Kuany (basketball, born 1994), South Sudanese basketball player
 Kuany Kuany (basketball, born 2000), South Sudanese basketball player